The 1937 Fresno State Bulldogs football team represented Fresno State Normal School—now known as California State University, Fresno—during the 1937 college football season.

Fresno State competed in the Far Western Conference (FWC). The 1937 team was led by second-year head coach James Bradshaw and played home games at Fresno State College Stadium on the campus of Fresno City College in Fresno, California. They finished the season as champion of the FWC with a regular season record of seven wins, one loss and one tie (7–1–1, 4–0 FWC). The Bulldogs outscored their opponents 223–75 for the season. That included holding opponents under 10 points seven times, with four shutouts. At the end of the season, the Bulldogs were invited to play in their first postseason bowl game, the Christmas Day Charity Bowl game against  played in Los Angeles. Fresno State won the game, 27–26, giving them a final record of eight wins, one loss and one tie (8–1–1).

Schedule

Notes

References

Fresno State
Fresno State Bulldogs football seasons
Northern California Athletic Conference football champion seasons
Fresno State Bulldogs football